Cummingsville is an unincorporated community in Olmsted County, in the U.S. state of Minnesota.

History
The community was named for its founder, Francis H. Cummings. It was founded in 1855, and at the time featured a sawmill alongside the Root River. By 1920, it was regarded as a former village.

References

Unincorporated communities in Olmsted County, Minnesota
Unincorporated communities in Minnesota